3x3 basketball competition (as Beach basketball) at the 2014 Asian Beach Games was held in Phuket, Thailand from 15 to 18 November 2014 at Karon Beach, Phuket Island, Thailand.

Medalists

Medal table

Results

Men

Preliminary

Group A

Group B

Knockout round

Quarterfinals

Semifinals

Bronze medal match

Gold medal game

Women

Preliminary

Group A

Group B

Knockout round

Semifinals

Bronze medal game

Gold medal game

References 

Men's tournament summary
Women's tournament summary

External links 
 Official website

2014
basketball
2014–15 in Asian basketball
2014–15 in Thai basketball
International basketball competitions hosted by Thailand
2014 in 3x3 basketball